Claus Clausen may refer to:

Claus Kristian Randolph Clausen (1869–1958), U.S. Navy officer in Spanish–American War
Claus Lauritz Clausen (1820–1892), pioneer Lutheran minister, military chaplain and politician
Claus Clausen (actor) (1899–1989), German actor